In Greek mythology, Idomeneus was a Cretan king and commander who led the Cretan armies to the Trojan War, in eighty black ships. He was also one of the suitors of Helen, as well as a comrade of the Telamonian Ajax. Meriones was his charioteer and brother-in-arms.

Description 
Idomeneus was described by the chronicler Malalas in his account of the Chronography as "above average height, dark-skinned, good eyes, well set, strong, good nose, thick beard, good head, curly hair, a berserker when fighting".

Family 
Idomeneus was the son of Deucalion and Cleopatra, grandson of King Minos and king of Crete and Queen Pasiphaë, thus tracing his line from Helios the sun god. He was husband of Meda by whom she became the mother of Orsilochus, Cleisithyra, Iphiclus and Lycus.

Mythology 
In Homer's Iliad, Idomeneus is found among the first rank of the Greek generals, leading his troops and engaging the enemy head-on, and escaping serious injury. Idomeneus was one of Agamemnon's trusted advisors. He was one of the primary defenders when most of the other Achaean heroes were injured, and even fought Hector briefly and repulsed his attack. Like most of the other leaders of the Greeks, he is alive and well as the story comes to a close. He was one of the Achaeans to enter the Trojan Horse. Idomeneus killed twenty men and at least three Amazon women, including Bremusa, at Troy.

A later tradition, preserved by the mythographer Apollodorus, continues the story as follows: after the war, Idomeneus's ship hit a terrible storm. He promised Poseidon that he would sacrifice the first living thing he saw when he returned home if Poseidon would save his ship and crew. The first living thing was his son, whom Idomeneus duly sacrificed. The gods were angry at Idomeneus’s murder of his own son and sent a plague to Crete. The Cretans sent him into exile in Calabria (ancient name of the Salento in Apulia), Italy and then Colophon in Asia Minor where he died. According to Marcus Terrentius Varro, the gens Salentini descended from Idomeneus, who had sailed from Crete to Illyria, and then together with Illyrians and Locrians from Illyria to Salento, see Grecìa Salentina.

Alternatively, Idomeneus was driven out of Crete by Leucus, his foster son, who had seduced and then killed Idomeneus' wife Meda and usurped the throne of Crete.

The tale is also covered by the fourth-century Roman writer Maurus Servius Honoratus, and the French 17th century writer François Fénelon.

Idomeneo, a 1781 opera seria by Mozart, is based on the story of Idomeneus's return to Crete. In this version, Poseidon (Neptune in the opera) spares Idomeneo's son Idamante, on condition that Idomeneo relinquish his throne to the new generation.

Gallery

Notes

References 
Achterberg, Winfried; Best, Jan; Enzler, Kees; Rietveld, Lia; Woudhuizen, Fred, The Phaistos Disc: A Luwian Letter to Nestor, Publications of the Henry Frankfort Foundation vol XIII, Dutch Archeological and Historical Society, Amsterdam 2004.
Apollodorus, The Library with an English Translation by Sir James George Frazer, F.B.A., F.R.S. in 2 Volumes, Cambridge, MA, Harvard University Press; London, William Heinemann Ltd. 1921. ISBN 0-674-99135-4. Online version at the Perseus Digital Library. Greek text available from the same website.
Gaius Julius Hyginus, Fabulae from The Myths of Hyginus translated and edited by Mary Grant. University of Kansas Publications in Humanistic Studies. Online version at the Topos Text Project.
Homer, The Iliad with an English Translation by A.T. Murray, Ph.D. in two volumes. Cambridge, MA., Harvard University Press; London, William Heinemann, Ltd. 1924. . Online version at the Perseus Digital Library.
Homer, Homeri Opera in five volumes. Oxford, Oxford University Press. 1920. . Greek text available at the Perseus Digital Library.
Quintus Smyrnaeus, The Fall of Troy translated by Way. A. S. Loeb Classical Library Volume 19. London: William Heinemann, 1913. Online version at theio.com
Quintus Smyrnaeus, The Fall of Troy. Arthur S. Way. London: William Heinemann; New York: G.P. Putnam's Sons. 1913. Greek text available at the Perseus Digital Library.
Publius Vergilius Maro, Aeneid. Theodore C. Williams. trans. Boston. Houghton Mifflin Co. 1910. Online version at the Perseus Digital Library.
Publius Vergilius Maro, Bucolics, Aeneid, and Georgics. J. B. Greenough. Boston. Ginn & Co. 1900. Latin text available at the Perseus Digital Library.

External links

Achaean Leaders
Princes in Greek mythology
Kings of Crete
Kings in Greek mythology
Mycenaean Crete
Human sacrifice
Cretan characters in Greek mythology